The 2017 Cleveland Indians season was the 117th season for the franchise. It was the fifth season under the leadership of manager Terry Francona and second under general manager Mike Chernoff. The team entered as the defending American League champion and World Series runner-up. The Indians played all of their home games at Progressive Field in Cleveland, Ohio.

On September 13, the Cleveland Indians won their 21st game in a row for the longest winning streak in American League history, surpassing the mark set by the Oakland Athletics in 2002, and tying the 1880 Chicago White Stockings and the 1935 Chicago Cubs for the second longest winning streak in Major League Baseball history. Their win streak reached 22 games on September 14, giving the Indians the second-longest winning streak in Major League Baseball history.  They were four games short of tying the Major League record of 26 straight wins held by the 1916 New York Giants. On September 15, the 22-game win streak ended in a 4–3 loss to the Kansas City Royals.

The Indians finished the season with a record of 102–60, the best record in the American League. They won their second straight American League Central title but were upset by the New York Yankees in five games in the American League Division Series. Their 102 win total was the most wins the Indians had since the 1954 season.

As the Cubs beat them in the previous year's World Series, the Indians were left with the longest active World Series drought, and their drought was extended to 69 years.

Offseason
 January 5, 2017:  Signed free agent designated hitter Edwin Encarnación to a three-year, $60 million contract.  The deal includes a club option for the 2020 season worth an additional $25 million, or a $5 million buyout.
 March 28:  Signed third baseman José Ramírez to a five-year contract extension worth $26 million.

Regular season

Opening Day starting lineup

April

The Indians opened the season by sweeping the Texas Rangers in Arlington.  This series was highlighted by a 9−6 win on April 5 in which Francisco Lindor hit his first career grand slam during the five-run 9th inning in which the Indians erased a 6-4 deficit.  However, the Indians would go on to lose six of their next seven games.  The Indians' lone win in that stretch was a 2-1 win in the team's home opener over the Chicago White Sox.  The Indians started the season with two of their key contributors from 2016 - Lonnie Chisenhall and Jason Kipnis - on the disabled list.  Chisenhall returned to the Indians on April 13.

The Indians finished April 14-10, with the bright spot of the month being a 5-0 road trip against the Chicago White Sox and the Minnesota Twins.

May
On May 2, starting pitcher Corey Kluber left the game with a lower back strain, and would miss the rest of the month.  He had posted a 3−2 record, 5.06 ERA, 41 strikeouts and 13 walks in  innings.  Without Kluber in the rotation, the Indians could not establish any consistency, finishing the month 13-14, their only sub-.500 month of the season.  The month was highlighted by a sweep of the AL West leading Houston Astros in Houston.

June
SP Corey Kluber would return to the Indians' rotation on June 1, as he would go six shutout innings en route to an 8-0 win over the Oakland Athletics.  After struggling through the early part of June, the Indians would win six in a row from June 15–19, including a 4-game road sweep of the Minnesota Twins, with whom the Indians were battling for the lead in the AL Central.  However, the Twins would return the favor a week later, sweeping the Indians in Cleveland.  On June 26, the Indians had one of their more impressive wins of the season, coming back from a 9-2 deficit to defeat the Texas Rangers, 15-9.

José Ramírez collected nine consecutive multi-hit games in June, the longest such streak for an Indians player since Roy Hughes in 1936.  Ramírez was named AL Player of the Week for the first time in his career on June 18, after batting .516 with 16 hits, three home runs, seven RBI and a stolen base.  He raised his average from .265 to .320 over his previous 22 games.

The Indians went 15-12 in June, to improve to 42-36 on the season.  Kluber was selected as the AL Pitcher of the Month for June after posting a 4–0 record, 43 IP, 1.26 ERA, 64 SO, 0.67 WHIP and 13.4 K/9 in six starts.  It was the third time in his career he had won the award.

July
On July 2, OF Michael Brantley, SP Corey Kluber, SS Francisco Lindor, RP Andrew Miller, and 3B José Ramírez were all named to the American League team for MLB All-Star Game, played at Marlins Park in Miami.  Ramírez started the game at third base, becoming the first Indian to start in the game since Juan González in 2001.  As the AL representative in the 2016 World Series, the Indians' coaching staff coached the AL team.  Manager Terry Francona had to miss the game, as well as six Indians games due to a heart procedure.

In the fifth inning of the July 7, contest against the Detroit Tigers, Carlos Carrasco pitched an immaculate inning, striking out the side on the minimum nine pitches. He became only the second pitcher in Indians history to do so, following Justin Masterson in 2014, and the 84th in MLB history.

When Jason Kipnis sustained a hamstring injury on July 9, the Indians placed him on the 10-day DL,  and shifted Ramírez to cover second base to replace him for much of the remainder of the season.

The Indians started July 6−8, including a tough west-coast trip following the All-Star break that saw the team go 1−5 against the last place Oakland Athletics and San Francisco Giants.  After that trip, however, the Indians swept a seven-game home stand as part of a nine-game winning streak.  On July 22, Lindor hit his first career walk-off home run in the 10th inning against the Toronto Blue Jays for a 2−1 victory.

The Indians would finish the month 15-10.  On July 31, the Indians acquired RP Joe Smith from the Blue Jays.

August
On August 3, Corey Kluber struck out 11 batters and gave up three hits in a 5−1 complete game win against the New York Yankees, making him the fourth pitcher ever to get eight or more strikeouts in 12 consecutive starts.  The preceding three were Nolan Ryan, Pedro Martínez and Randy Johnson.

The Indians finished the month of August with a 19−9 record, including eight straight wins to end the month.  Kluber won his second AL Pitcher of the Month Award of the season for August, totaling a 5−1 record and 1.96 ERA.

September/October
On September 3, José Ramírez tied a major league record with five extra-base hits, which included three doubles and two home runs.  Ramírez was named AL Player of the Week on September 5.

Corey Kluber pitched his third shutout of the season with 12 strikeouts on September 12, against the Detroit Tigers, giving the Indians their 20th consecutive win, matching the 2002 Oakland Athletics for the American League record.  Kluber scattered five hits while allowing no walks and struck out eight.  On September 13, Cleveland broke the AL record for consecutive wins with its 21st straight, surpassing the 2002 A's, and moved into a tie with the 1935 Chicago Cubs for the second-longest winning streak in baseball history.  The major league record is 26 consecutive wins, set by the New York Giants, accomplished September 7−30, 1916. The Indians would win a 22nd straight game the next day, but their streak was snapped on September 15, with a 4-3 loss to the Kansas City Royals.  During the streak, the Indians had outscored their opponents 142–37, trailing after just eight of a possible 199 full innings.

Kluber won the AL Player of the Week Award for September 17 after becoming the third Indians pitcher with multiple 250-strikeout seasons.   Carrasco struck out 14 Minnesota Twins batters on September 28, 2017, in a 5−2 score to give Cleveland their 100th win of the season.  It was the third time in franchise history they had reached 100 wins in one season, following the 1954 club (111 wins) and the 1995 club (100).

Kluber, later named the AL Pitcher of the Month for September, produced a 5−0 W−L record, 0.84 ERA, 50 strikeouts and 43 innings pitched.  The Indians' record for the month was 25−4, and included the majority of the 22-game win streak, with Kluber pitching Cleveland to three of those victories in September.

The Indians clinched a playoff spot on September 14, the AL Central championship on September 17, and the #1 seed in the American League playoffs on September 30.  The team finished the season with a record of 102–60 (.630).  The 102 wins marked the team's second highest win total in franchise history, trailing only the 1954 Indians.  The Indians led the major leagues in both ERA (3.30) and in pitching strikeouts (1,614).  It was the fourth consecutive season they led the American League in strikeouts.

Season standings

American League Central

American League Wild Card

Record against opponents

Roster

Game log

|- style="background:#bfb;"
| 1 || April 3 || @ Rangers || 8–5 || Miller (1–0) || Dyson (0–1) || Allen (1) || 48,350 ||  1–0 ||W1
|- style="background:#bfb;"
| 2 || April 4 || @ Rangers || 4–3 || Carrasco (1–0) || Pérez (0–1) || Allen (2) || 23,574 || 2–0 ||W2
|- style="background:#bfb;"
| 3 || April 5 || @ Rangers || 9–6 || Armstrong (1–0) || Dyson (0–2) || Shaw (1) || 24,649 || 3–0 ||W3
|- style="background:#fbb;"
| 4 || April 7 || @ Diamondbacks || 3–7 || Miller (1–0) || Tomlin (0–1) || — || 22,443 || 3–1 ||L1
|- style="background:#fbb;"
| 5 || April 8 || @ Diamondbacks || 2–11 ||Greinke (1–0) || Bauer (0–1) || — || 28,437 || 3–2 ||L2
|- style= "background:#fbb;"
| 6 || April 9 || @ Diamondbacks || 2–3 || Corbin (1–1) || Kluber (0–1) || Rodney (2) || 30,191 || 3–3 ||L3
|- style ="background:#bfb;"
| 7 || April 11 || White Sox || 2–1 (10)||  Shaw (1–0) || Kahnle (0–1) || — || 35,002 || 4–3 ||W1
|- style ="background:#fbb;"
| 8 || April 12 || White Sox || 1–2 || Holland (1–1) || Salazar (0–1) || Robertson (1) || 15,628 || 4–4 ||L1
|- style ="background:#fbb;"
| 9 || April 13 || White Sox || 4–10 || Swarzak (1–0) || Tomlin (0–2) || — || 15,060 || 4–5 ||L2
|- style="background:#fbb;"
| 10 || April 14 || Tigers || 6–7 || Norris (1–0) || Bauer (0–2) || Rodríguez (4) || 25,423 || 4–6 ||L3
|- style="background:#bfb;"
| 11 || April 15 || Tigers || 13–6 || Kluber (1–1) || Verlander (1–1) || — || 26,691 || 5–6 ||W1
|- style="background:#fbb;"
| 12 || April 16 || Tigers || 1–4 || Boyd (2–1) || Carrasco (1–1) || Rodríguez (5) || 17,739 || 5–7 ||L1
|- style="background:#bfb;"
| 13 || April 17 || @ Twins || 3–1 || Salazar (1–1) || Gibson (0–2) || Allen (3) || 16,961 || 6–7 ||W1
|- style="background:#bfb;"
| 14 || April 18 || @ Twins || 11–4 || Tomlin (1–2) || Hughes (2–1) || — || 16,553 || 7–7 ||W2
|- style="background:#bbb;"
| –– || April 19 || @ Twins || colspan="8" | Postponed (rain). Makeup date: June 17 (Game 2).
|- style="background:#bfb;"
| 15 || April 20 || @ Twins || 6–2 || Bauer (1–2) || Duffey (0–1) || — || 17,339 || 8–7 ||W3
|- style="background:#bfb;"
| 16 || April 21 || @ White Sox || 3–0 || Kluber (2–1) || Quintana (0–4) || — || 18,159 || 9–7 ||W4
|- style="background:#bfb;"
| 17 || April 22 || @ White Sox || 7–0 || Carrasco (2–1) || Pelfrey (0–1) || — || 32,044 || 10–7 ||W5
|- style="background:#fbb;"
| 18 || April 23 || @ White Sox || 2–6 || Holland (2–2) || Salazar (1–2) || — || 24,444 || 10–8 ||L1
|- style="background:#fbb;"
| 19 || April 25 || Astros || 2–4 || Keuchel (4–0) || Tomlin (1–3) || — || 14,581 || 10–9 ||L2
|- style="background:#bfb;"
| 20 || April 26 || Astros  || 7–6 || Bauer (2–2) || McCullers Jr. (2–1) || Allen (4) || 16,052 || 11–9 ||W1
|- style="background:#bfb;"
| 21 || April 27 || Astros  || 4–3 || Kluber (3–1) || Devenski (1–1) || Allen (5) || 14,452 || 12–9 ||W2
|- style="background:#fbb;"
| 22 || April 28 || Mariners || 1–3 || Miranda (2–2) || Carrasco (2–2) || Díaz (4) || 20,842 || 12–10 ||L1
|- style="background:#bfb;"
| 23 || April 29 || Mariners || 4–3 || Salazar (2–2) || Gallardo (1–3) || Allen (6) || 21,221 || 13–10 ||W1
|- style="background:#bfb;"
| 24 || April 30 || Mariners || 12–4 || Tomlin (2–3) || De Jong (0–2) || — || 21,824 || 14–10 ||W2
|-

|- style="background:#fbb;"
| 25 || May 1 || @ Tigers || 1–7 || Norris (2–2) || Bauer (2–3) || — || 22,045 || 14–11 ||L1
|- style="background:#fbb;"
| 26 || May 2 || @ Tigers || 2–5 || Verlander (2–2) || Kluber (3–2) || Rodríguez (7) || 21,799 || 14–12 ||L2
|- style="background:#bfb;"
| 27 || May 3 || @ Tigers || 3–2 || Carrasco (3–2) || Boyd (2–2) || Allen (7) || 22,663 || 15–12 ||W1
|- style="background:#bbb;"
| — || May 4 || @ Tigers || colspan="8" | Postponed (rain). Makeup date: July 1 (Game 1).
|- style="background:#fbb;"
| 28 || May 5 || @ Royals || 1–3 || Hammel (1–3) || Salazar (2–3) || Herrera (4) || 25,722 || 15–13 ||L1
|-  style="background:#bfb;"
| 29 || May 6 || @ Royals || 3–1  || Miller (2–0)  || Herrera (1–1)  || Allen (8)  || 23,743 || 16–13 || W1
|- style="background:#bfb;"
| 30 || May 7 || @ Royals || 1–0 || Clevinger (1–0) || Duffy (2–3) || Allen (9) || 25,754 || 17–13 ||W2
|- style="background:#fbb;"
| 31 || May 8 || @ Blue Jays || 2–4 || Stroman (3–2) || Bauer (2–4) || Osuna (5) || 40,014 || 17–14 ||L1
|- style="background:#bfb;"
| 32 || May 9 || @ Blue Jays || 6–0 || Carrasco (4–2) || Bolsinger (0–1) || — || 32,688 || 18–14 ||W1
|- style="background:#fbb;"
| 33 || May 10 || @ Blue Jays || 7–8 || Osuna (2–0) || Allen (0–1) || — || 35,115 || 18–15 ||L1
|- style="background:#fbb;"
| 34 || May 12 || Twins || 0–1 || Santana (6–1) || Tomlin (2–4) || Kintzler (9) || 24,452 || 18–16 ||L2
|- style="background:#fbb;"
| 35 || May 13 || Twins || 1–4 || Berríos (1–0) || Clevinger (1–1) || Kintzler (10) || 28,379 || 18–17 ||L3
|- style="background:#bfb;"
| 36 || May 14 || Twins || 8–3 || Bauer (3–4) || Santiago (4–2) || — || 23,099 || 19–17 ||W1
|- style="background:#bfb;"
| 37 || May 15 || Rays || 8–7 || Logan (1–0) || Archer (3–2) || Allen (10) || 14,613 || 20–17 ||W2
|- style="background:#fbb;"
| 38 || May 16 || Rays || 4–6 || Odorizzi (3–2) || Salazar (2–4) || Colomé (10) || 18,238 || 20–18 ||L1
|- style="background:#fbb;"
| 39 || May 17 || Rays || 4–7 || Cobb (3–4) || Tomlin (2–5) || — || 22,104 || 20–19 ||L2
|- style="background:#bfb;"
| 40 || May 19 || @ Astros || 5–3 || Bauer (4–4) || Morton (5–3)  || Allen (11) || 36,446 || 21–19 ||W1
|- style="background:#bfb;" 
| 41 || May 20 || @ Astros || 3–0 || Clevinger (2–1) || Fiers (1–2) || Allen (12) || 34,698 || 22–19 ||W2
|- style="background:#bfb;"
| 42 || May 21 || @ Astros || 8–6 || Salazar (3–4) || Musgrove (3–4) || — || 33,476 || 23–19 ||W3
|- style="background:#fbb;"
| 43 || May 22 || @ Reds || 1–5 || Feldman (3–4) || Tomlin (2–6) || — || 26,794 || 23–20 ||L1
|- style="background:#bfb;"
| 44 || May 23 || @ Reds || 8–7 || Miller (3–0) || Storen (1–1) || Allen (13) || 26,334 || 24–20 ||W1
|- style="background:#fbb;"
| 45 || May 24 || Reds || 3–4 || Lorenzen (3–0) || Allen (0–2) || Iglesias (8) || 19,426 || 24–21 ||L1
|- style="background:#bbb;"
| — || May 25 || Reds || colspan="8"| Postponed (rain). Makeup date: July 24.
|- style="background:#fbb;"
| 46 || May 26 || Royals || 4–6 || Minor (2–1) || Shaw (1–1) || Herrera (10) || 29,603 || 24–22 ||L2
|-  style="background:#fbb;"
| 47 || May 27 || Royals || 2–5 || Vargas (6–3) || Salazar (3–5) || Herrera (11) || 30,920 || 24–23 ||L3
|- style="background:#bfb;"
| 48 || May 28 || Royals || 10–1 || Tomlin (3–6) ||  Duffy (4–4) || — || 23,136 || 25–23 ||W1
|- style="background:#bfb;"
| 49 || May 29 || Athletics || 5–3 || Carrasco (5–2) || Mengden (0–1) || Allen (14) || 20,792 || 26–23 ||W2
|- style="background:#bfb;"
| 50 || May 30 || Athletics || 9–4 || Bauer (5–4) || Gray (2–2) || — || 14,184 || 27–23 ||W3
|- style="background:#fbb;"
| 51 || May 31 || Athletics || 1–3 || Manaea (4–3) || Clevinger (2–2) || Casilla (8) || 16,784 || 27–24 ||L1
|-

|- style="background:#bfb;"
| 52 || June 1 || Athletics || 8–0 || Kluber (4–2) || Cotton (3–6) || — || 19,767 || 28–24 ||W1
|- style="background:#fbb;"
| 53 || June 2 || @ Royals || 0–4 || Vargas  (7–3) || Tomlin (3–7) || — || 33,408 || 28–25 ||L1
|- style="background:#fbb;"
| 54 || June 3 || @ Royals || 5–12 || Hammel (2–6) || Carrasco (5–3) || — || 26,497 || 28–26 ||L2
|- style="background:#bfb;"
| 55 || June 4 || @ Royals || 8–0 || Otero (1–0) || Skoglund (1–1) || — || 28,185 || 29–26 ||W1
|- style="background:#fbb;"
| 56 || June 6 || @ Rockies || 3–11 || Senzatela (8–2) || Clevinger (2–3) || — || 39,508 || 29–27 ||L1
|-  style="background:#fbb;"
| 57 || June 7 || @ Rockies || 1–8 || Freeland (7–3) || Bauer (5–5) || — || 36,909 || 29–28 ||L2
|- style="background:#bfb;"
| 58 || June 9 || White Sox || 7–3 || Kluber (5–2) || González (4–7) || — || 30,043 || 30–28 ||W1
|- style="background:#fbb;"
| 59 || June 10 || White Sox || 3–5 || Holmberg (1–0) || Tomlin (3–8) || Robertson (10) || 31,753 || 30–29 ||L1
|- style="background:#bfb;"
| 60 || June 11 || White Sox || 4–2 || Carrasco (6–3) || Quintana (2–8) || Allen (15) || 26,611 || 31–29 ||W1
|- style="background:#fbb;"
| 61 || June 13 || Dodgers || 5–7 || Kershaw (9–2) || Miller (3–1) || Jansen (12) || 22,171 || 31–30 ||L1
|- style="background:#fbb;"
| 62 || June 14 || Dodgers || 4–6 || Fields (3–0) || Miller (3–2) || Jansen (13) || 21,051 || 31–31 ||L2
|- style="background:#bfb;"
| 63 || June 15 || Dodgers || 12–5 || Tomlin (4–8) || Hill  (3–3) || — || 23,339 || 32–31 ||W1
|- style="background:#bfb;"
| 64 || June 16 || @ Twins || 8–1 || Carrasco (7–3) || Turley (0–1) || — || 30,563 || 33–31 ||W2
|- style="background:#bfb;"
| 65 || June 17 || @ Twins || 9–3 || McAllister (1–0) || Wilk (0–2) || — || 24,010 || 34–31 ||W3
|- style="background:#bfb;"
| 66 || June 17 || @ Twins || 6–2 || Goody (1–0) || Mejía (1–3) || — || 21,371 || 35–31 ||W4
|- style="background:#bfb;"
| 67 || June 18 || @ Twins || 5–2 || Bauer (6–5) || Gibson (4–5) || Miller (1)  || 35,039 || 36–31 ||W5
|- style="background:#bfb;"
| 68 || June 19 || @ Orioles || 12–0 || Kluber (6–2) || Bundy (7–6) || — || 13,875 || 37–31 ||W6
|- style="background:#fbb;"
| 69 || June 20 || @ Orioles || 5–6 || Castro (1–0) || Shaw (1–2) || Brach (13) || 22,891 || 37–32 ||L1
|- style="background:#bfb;"
| 70 || June 21 || @ Orioles || 5–1 || Carrasco (8–3) || Gausman (3–7) || Shaw (2) || 26,596 || 38–32 ||W1
|- style="background:#bfb;"
| 71 || June 22 || @ Orioles || 6–3 || Clevinger (3–3) || Miley (3–5) || — || 24,954 || 39–32 ||W2
|- style="background:#fbb;"
| 72 || June 23 || Twins || 0–5 || Mejía (2–3) || Bauer (6–6) || — || 31,725 || 39–33 ||L1
|- style="background:#fbb;"
| 73 || June 24 || Twins || 2–4 || Rogers (4–1) || Allen (0–3) || Kintzler (20) || 33,111 || 39–34 ||L2
|- style="background:#fbb;"
| 74 || June 25 || Twins || 0–4 || Santana (10–4) || Tomlin (4–9) || — || 29,672 || 39–35 ||L3
|- style="background:#bfb;"
| 75 || June 26 || Rangers || 15–9 || Shaw (2–2) || Scheppers (0–1) || — || 17,672 || 40–35 ||W1
|- style="background:#fbb;"
| 76 || June 27 || Rangers || 1–2 || Kela (4–1) || Allen (0–4) || Bush (10) || 19,348 || 40–36 ||L1
|- style="background:#bfb;"
| 77 || June 28 || Rangers || 5–3 || Bauer (7–6) || Darvish (6–6) || — || 21,200 || 41–36 ||W1
|- style="background:#bfb;"
| 78 || June 29 || Rangers || 5–1 || Kluber (7–2) || Cashner (3–7) || — || 23,996 || 42–36 ||W2
|- style="background:#bbb;"
| — || June 30 || @ Tigers || colspan="8"| Postponed (rain). Makeup date: September 1 (Game 1).
|-

|- style="background:#fbb;"
| 79 || July 1 || @ Tigers || 4–7 || Greene (2–2) || Shaw (2–3) || Wilson (8) || 28,719 || 42–37 || L1
|- style="background:#bfb;" 
| 80 || July 1 || @ Tigers || 4–1 || Carrasco (9–3) || Zimmermann (5–6) || Miller (2) || 27,016 || 43–37 ||W1
|- style="background:#bfb;" 
| 81 || July 2 || @ Tigers || 11–8 || Clevinger (4–3) || Verlander (5–5) || Allen (16) || 30,429 || 44–37 || W2
|- style="background:#fbb;"
| 82 || July 4 || Padres || 0–1 || Torres (5–2) || Kluber (7–3) || Maurer (17) || 33,869 || 44–38 || L1
|- style="background:#fbb;"
| 83 || July 5 || Padres || 2–6 || Perdomo (4–4) || Bauer (7–7) || — || 18,765 || 44–39 || L2
|- style="background:#bfb;"
| 84 || July 6 || Padres || 11–2 || Tomlin (5–9) || Lamet (3–3) || — || 19,057 || 45–39 || W1
|- style="background:#bfb;"
| 85 || July 7 || Tigers || 11–2 || Carrasco (10–3) || Zimmermann (5–7) || — || 32,307 || 46–39 ||W2
|- style="background:#bfb;"
| 86 || July 8 || Tigers || 4–0 || Clevinger (5–3) || Verlander (5–6) || — || 34,726 || 47–39 ||W3
|- style=background:#fbb;"
| 87 || July 9 || Tigers || 3–5 || Fulmer (9–6) || Goody (1–1) || Wilson (10) || 24,915 || 47–40 ||L1
|- style="text-align:center; background:#bbcaff;"
| colspan="10" | 88th All-Star Game
|- style="background:#fbb;"
| 88 || July 14 || @ Athletics || 0–5 || Gray (5–4) || Carrasco (10–4) || — || 19,870 || 47–41 ||L2
|- style="background:#fbb;"
| 89 || July 15 || @ Athletics || 3–5 || Madson (2–4) || Miller (3–3) || — || 33,021 || 47–42 ||L3
|- style="background:#fbb;"
| 90 || July 16 || @ Athletics || 3–7 || Manaea (8–5) || Bauer (7–8) || — || 25,509 || 47–43 ||L4
|- style="background:#bfb;"
| 91 || July 17 || @ Giants || 5–3 || Tomlin (6–9) || Moore (3–10) || Allen (17) || 39,538 || 48–43 ||W1
|- style="background:#fbb;"
| 92 || July 18 || @ Giants ||  1–2 (10) || Dyson (2–7) || Allen (0–5) || — || 39,151 || 48–44 ||L1
|- style="background:#fbb;"
| 93 || July 19 || @ Giants || 4–5 || Gearrin (4–3) || Shaw (2–4) || Dyson (5) || 41,067 || 48–45 ||L2
|- style="background:#bfb;"
| 94 || July 21 || Blue Jays || 13–3 || Bauer (8–8) || Estrada (4–7) || — || 34,284 || 49–45 ||W1
|- style="background:#bfb;"
| 95 || July 22 || Blue Jays || 2–1 (10) || Shaw (3–4) || Barnes (2–3) || — || 34,569 || 50–45 ||W2
|-  style="background:#bfb;"
| 96 || July 23 || Blue Jays || 8–1 || Kluber (8–3) || Happ (3–7) || — || 30,701 || 51–45 ||W3
|- style="background:#bfb;"
| 97 || July 24 || Reds || 6–2 || Tomlin (7–9) || Adleman (5–8) || — || 21,500 || 52–45 ||W4
|- style="background:#bfb;"
| 98 || July 25 || Angels || 11–7 (11) || Otero (2–0) || Norris (1–3) || — || 22,364 || 53–45 ||W5
|- style="background:#bfb;"
| 99 || July 26 || Angels || 10–4 || Shaw (4–4) || Nolasco (4–12) || — || 22,658 || 54–45 ||W6
|- style="background:#bfb;"
| 100 || July 27 || Angels || 2–1 || Bauer (9–8) || Ramírez (9–9) || Allen (18) || 28,083 || 55–45 ||W7
|- style="background:#bfb;"
| 101 || July 28 || @ White Sox || 9–3 || Salazar (4–5) || Holland (5–10) || — || 20,387 || 56–45 ||W8
|- style="background:#bfb;"
| 102 || July 29 || @ White Sox || 5–4 || Miller (4–3) || Bummer (0–1) || Allen (19) || 30,115 || 57–45 ||W9
|- style="background:#fbb;"
| 103 || July 30 || @ White Sox || 1–3 || Clippard (2–6) || Shaw (4–5) || — || 28,152 || 57–46 ||L1
|- style="background:#fbb;"
| 104 || July 31 || @ Red Sox || 2–6 || Fister (1–5) || Clevinger (5–4) || — || 37,169 || 57–47 ||L2
|-

|- style="background:#fbb;"
| 105 || August 1 || @ Red Sox || 10–12 || Kimbrel (3–0) || Allen (0–6) || — || 37,126 || 57–48 ||L3
|- style="background:#bbb;"
| — || August 2 || @ Red Sox || colspan="7"| Postponed (rain). Makeup date: August 14.
|- style="background:#bfb;"
| 106 || August 3 || Yankees || 5–1 || Kluber (9–3) || Gray (6–6) || — || 28,124 || 58–48 ||W1
|- style="background:#bfb;"
| 107 || August 4 || Yankees || 7–2 || Bauer (10–8) || García (5–8) || — || 34,466 || 59–48 ||W2
|- style="background:#fbb;"
| 108 || August 5 || Yankees || 1–2 || Robertson (5–2) ||  McAllister (1–1) || Chapman (14) || 34,651 || 59–49 ||L1
|- style="background:#fbb;"
| 109 || August 6 || Yankees || 1–8 || Severino (9–4) || Carrasco (10–5) || — || 33,044 || 59–50 ||L2
|- style="background:#bfb;"
| 110 || August 8 || Rockies || 4–1 || Kluber (10–3) || Holland (2–3) || — || 26,088 || 60–50 ||W1
|- style="background:#fbb;"
| 111 || August 9 || Rockies  || 2–3 (12) || Estévez (5–0) || McAllister (1–2) || Chatwood (1) || 25,539 || 60–51 || L1
|- style="background:#fbb;"
| 112 || August 10 || @ Rays || 1–4 || Hunter (2–2) || Goody (1–2) || Colomé (34) || 9,533 || 60–52 || L2
|- style="background:#bfb;"
| 113 || August 11 || @ Rays || 5–0 || Carrasco (11–5) || Faria (5–3) || — || 16,794 || 61–52 || W1
|- style="background:#bfb;"
| 114 || August 12 || @ Rays || 3–0 || Clevinger (6–4) || Archer (8–7) || Allen (20) || 22,024 || 62–52 || W2
|- style ="background:#bfb;"
| 115 || August 13 || @ Rays || 4–3 || Kluber (11–3) || Hunter (2–3) || Allen (21) || 17,775 || 63–52 || W3
|- style ="background:#bfb;"
| 116 || August 14 || @ Red Sox || 7–3 || Bauer (11–8)  || Fister (2–6)  || — || 37,430 || 64–52 || W4
|- style ="background:#bfb;"
| 117 || August 15 || @ Twins || 8–1 || Salazar (5–5)  || Colón (2–2)  || — || 29,626 || 65–52 || W5
|- style="background:#bbb;"
| — || August 16 || @ Twins || colspan="7"| Postponed (rain). Makeup date: August 17 (Game 2).
|- style ="background:#bfb;"
| 118 || August 17 || @ Twins || 9–3 || Carrasco (12–5) || Gibson (6–10) || — || 29,579 || 66–52 || W6
|- style="background:#fbb;"
| 119 || August 17 || @ Twins || 2–4 || Hildenberger (2–1) || Clevinger (6–5) || Belisle (3) || 22,857 || 66–53 || L1
|- style ="background:#bfb;"
| 120 || August 18 || @ Royals || 10–1 || Kluber (12–3)  || Kennedy (4–9)  || — || 35,974  || 67–53 || W1
|- style ="background:#bfb;"
| 121 || August 19 || @ Royals || 5–0 || Bauer (12–8) || Vargas (14–7) || — || 34,204 || 68–53 || W2
|-  style="background:#fbb;"
| 122 || August 20 || @ Royals || 4–7 || Hammel (6–9) || Salazar (5–6) || — || 27,427 || 68–54 ||L1
|- style ="background:#bfb;"
| 123 || August 21 || Red Sox || 5–4 || Allen (1–6) || Workman (0–1) || — || 21,428 || 69–54 ||W1
|- style="background:#fbb;"
| 124 || August 22 || Red Sox || 1–9 || Fister (3–6) || Carrasco (12–6) || — || 19,563 || 69–55 ||L1
|- style="background:#fbb;"
| 125 || August 23 || Red Sox || 1–6 || Pomeranz (13–4) || Kluber (12–4) || — || 25,346 || 69–56 ||L2
|- style ="background:#bfb;"
| 126 || August 24 || Red Sox || 13–6 || Bauer (13–8) || Sale (14–6) || — || 21,643 || 70–56 ||W1
|- style ="background:#bfb;"
| 127 || August 25 || Royals || 4–0 || Merritt (1–0) || Vargas (14–8) || — || 34,061 || 71–56 || W2
|- style ="background:#bfb;"
| 128 || August 26 || Royals || 4–0 || Clevinger (7–5) || Hammel (6–10) || — || 34,273 || 72–56 ||W3
|- style ="background:#bfb;"
| 129 || August 27 || Royals || 12–0 || Carrasco (13–6) || Skoglund (1–2) || — || 32,229 || 73–56 ||W4
|- style ="background:#bfb;"
| 130 || August 28 || @ Yankees || 6–2 || Kluber (13–4) || Severino (11–6) || — || 36,253 || 74–56 ||W5 
|- style ="background:#bbb;"
| —   || August 29 || @ Yankees || colspan="7" |Postponed (rain). Makeup date: August 30 (Game 2).
|- style ="background:#bfb;"
| 131 || August 30 || @ Yankees || 2–1 || Bauer (14–8) || Garcia (5–9) || Allen (22) || || 75–56 ||W6
|- style ="background:#bfb;"
| 132 || August 30 || @ Yankees || 9–4 || Merritt (2–0) || Montgomery (7–7) || — || 39,598 || 76–56 ||W7 
|-

|- style ="background:#bfb;"
| 133 || September 1 || @ Tigers || 3–2 || Allen (2–6) || Greene (3–3) || Smith (1) || 26,093 || 77–56 ||W8
|- style ="background:#bfb;"
| 134 || September 1 || @ Tigers || 10–0 || Clevinger (8–5) || Farmer (3–2) || — || 24,342 || 78–56 ||W9
|- style ="background:#bfb;"
| 135 || September 2 || @ Tigers || 5–2 || Kluber (14–4) || Zimmermann (8–12) || Allen (23) || 25,272 || 79–56 ||W10
|- style ="background:#bfb;"
| 136 || September 3 || @ Tigers || 11–1 || Tomlin (8–9) || Bell (0–2) || — || 25,244 || 80–56 ||W11
|- style ="background:#bfb;"
| 137 || September 4 || @ White Sox || 5–3 || Bauer (15–8) || Shields (2–6)  || Allen (24) || 16,848 || 81–56 ||W12
|- style ="background:#bfb;"
| 138 || September 5 || @ White Sox || 9–4 || Otero (3–0) || Holmberg (2–4) || — || 12,369 || 82–56 ||W13
|- style ="background:#bfb;"
| 139 || September 6 || @ White Sox || 5–1 || Carrasco (14–6) || López (0–3) || — || 13,403 || 83–56 ||W14
|- style ="background:#bfb;"
| 140 || September 7 || @ White Sox || 11–2 || Kluber (15–4) || Pelfrey (3–11) || — || 17,019 || 84–56 ||W15
|- style ="background:#bfb;"
| 141 || September 8 || Orioles || 5–0 || Clevinger (9–5) || Miley (8–12) || — || 30,090 || 85–56 ||W16
|- style ="background:#bfb;"
| 142 || September 9 || Orioles || 4–2 || Tomlin (9–9) || Ynoa (1–1) || Allen (25) || 30,459 || 86–56 ||W17
|- style ="background:#bfb;"
| 143 || September 10 || Orioles || 3–2 || Bauer (16–8) || Hellickson (8–9) || Allen (26) || 21,259 || 87–56 ||W18
|- style ="background:#bfb;"
| 144 || September 11 || Tigers || 11–0 || Carrasco (15–6) || Jaye (1–1) || — || 18,521 || 88–56 ||W19
|- style ="background:#bfb;"
| 145 || September 12 || Tigers || 2–0 || Kluber (16–4) || Boyd (5–10) || — || 24,654 || 89–56 ||W20
|- style ="background:#bfb;"
| 146 || September 13 || Tigers || 5–3 || Clevinger (10–5) || Farmer (4–3)  || Allen (27) || 29,346 || 90–56 ||W21
|- style ="background:#bfb;"
| 147 || September 14 || Royals || 3–2 (10) || Allen (3–6) || Maurer (3–6) || — || 30,874 || 91–56 ||W22
|- style ="background:#fbb;"
| 148 || September 15 || Royals || 3–4 || Vargas (16–10) || Bauer (16–9) || Minor (1) || 34,025 || 91–57 || L1
|- style ="background:#bfb;"
| 149 || September 16 || Royals || 8–4 || Carrasco (16–6) || Hammel (8–12) || — || 33,688 || 92–57 || W1
|- style ="background:#bfb;"
| 150 || September 17 || Royals || 3–2 || Kluber (17–4) || Duffy (8–9) || Allen (28) || 32,313 || 93–57 || W2
|- style ="background:#bfb;"
| 151 || September 19 || @ Angels || 6–3 || Clevinger (11–5) || Skaggs (2–6) || – || 36,171 || 94–57 || W3
|- style ="background:#bfb;"
| 152 || September 20 || @ Angels || 6–5 || Olson (1–0) || Petit (5–1) || Shaw (3) || 38,424 || 95–57 || W4
|- style ="background:#bfb;"
| 153 || September 21 || @ Angels || 4–1 || McAllister (2–2) || Bridwell (8–3) || Olson (1) || 29,863 || 96–57 || W5
|- style ="background:#fbb;"
| 154 || September 22 || @ Mariners || 1–3 || Diaz (4–6) || Allen (3–7) || — || 27,462 || 96–58 ||L1
|- style ="background:#bfb;"
| 155 || September 23 || @ Mariners || 11–4 || Carrasco (17–6) || Moore (1–5) || – || 31,565 || 97–58 ||W1
|- style ="background:#bfb;"
| 156 || September 24 || @ Mariners || 4–2 || Kluber (18–4)  || Leake (10–13) || Allen (29) ||23,695  || 98–58 ||W2
|- style ="background:#fbb;"
| 157 || September 26 || Twins || 6–8 || Rogers (7–3) || Shaw (4–6) || Belisle (8) || 21,268 || 98–59 ||L1
|- style ="background:#bfb;"
| 158 || September 27 || Twins || 4–2 || Clevinger (12–5) || Mejia (4–7) || — || 19,682 || 99–59 ||W1
|- style ="background:#bfb;"
| 159 || September 28 || Twins ||  5–2  || Carrasco (18–6)  || Hildenberger (3–3)  || — || 21,810 || 100–59 ||W2
|- style ="background:#bfb;"
| 160 || September 29 || White Sox || 10–1 || Bauer (17–9) || Pelfrey (3–12) || — || 26,983 || 101–59 ||W3
|- style ="background:#fbb;"
| 161 || September 30 || White Sox || 1–2 || Fulmer (3–1) || Clevinger (12–6) || Minaya (9) || 33,173 || 101–60 ||L1
|- - style ="background:#bfb;"
| 162 || October 1 || White Sox || 3–1 || Tomlin (10–9) || Volstad (1–2) || Allen (30) || 30,036 || 102–60 ||W1
|- 
|- 

|- style="text-align:center;"
| Legend:       = Win       = Loss       = PostponementBold = Indians team member

Postseason

Game log

|-style="background:#bfb;"
| 1 || October 5 || Yankees || 4–0 || Bauer (1–0) || Gray (0–1) || Allen (1) || 37,612 || 1–0 
|-style="background:#bfb;"
| 2 || October 6 || Yankees || 9–8 (13)  || Tomlin (1–0) || Betances (0–1) ||  || 37,681 || 2–0
|-style="background:#fbb;"
| 3 || October 8 || @ Yankees || 0–1 || Tanaka (1–0) || Miller (0–1) || Chapman (1) || 48,614 || 2–1 
|-style="background:#fbb;"
| 4 || October 9 || @ Yankees || 3–7 || Severino (1–0) || Bauer (1–1) || Kahnle (1) || 47,316 || 2–2 
|-style="background:#fbb;"
| 5 || October 11 || Yankees || 2–5 || Robertson (1–0) || Kluber (0–1) || Chapman (2) || 37,802 || 2–3 
|-

|- style="text-align:center;"
| Legend:       = Win       = Loss     Bold = Indians team member

Postseason rosters

| style="text-align:left" |
Pitchers: 24 Andrew Miller 27 Bryan Shaw 28 Corey Kluber 31 Danny Salazar 37 Cody Allen 38 Joe Smith 43 Josh Tomlin 47 Trevor Bauer 49 Tyler Olson 52 Mike Clevinger 59 Carlos Carrasco 
Catchers: 7 Yan Gomes 55 Roberto Pérez 
Infielders: 9 Erik González 11 José Ramírez 12 Francisco Lindor 22 Jason Kipnis 39 Giovanny Urshela 41 Carlos Santana 
Outfielders: 8 Lonnie Chisenhall 23 Michael Brantley 26 Austin Jackson 32 Jay Bruce 53 Greg Allen 
Designated hitters: 10 Edwin Encarnación
|- valign="top"

Player stats

Batting
Note; G = Games played; AB = At bats; R = Runs scored; H = Hits; 2B = Doubles; 3B = Triples; HR = Home runs; RBI = Runs batted in; AVG = Batting average; SB = Stolen bases

Pitching
Note: W = Wins; L = Losses; ERA = Earned run average; GP = Games pitched; GS = Games started; SV = Saves; IP = Innings pitched; H = Hits allowed; R = Runs allowed; ER = Earned runs allowed; BB = Walks allowed; K = Strikeouts

Postseason player stats

Batting
Note: G = Games played; AB = At bats; R = Runs scored; H = Hits; 2B = Doubles; 3B = Triples; HR = Home runs; RBI = Runs batted in; SB = Stolen bases

Pitching
Note: W = Wins; L = Losses; ERA = Earned run average; G = Games pitched; GS = Games started; SV = Saves; IP = Innings pitched; H = Hits allowed; R = Total runs allowed; ER = Earned runs allowed; BB = Walks allowed; K = Strikeouts

Awards and league leaders

Awards
 American League Pitcher of the Month:
 3× Corey Kluber: June, August, September
 American League Player of the Week:
 2× Corey Kluber: June 25, September 17
 2× José Ramírez:  June 18, September 5
 Baseball America'''s All-MLB Team:
 Francisco Lindor (SS)
 José Ramírez (DH)
 Corey Kluber (SP)
 Silver Slugger Awards:
 José Ramírez (3B)
 Francisco Lindor (SS)
 Wilson Defensive Player of the Year at first base: Carlos Santana

League leaders
Batting
 Ref:
 At bats: Francisco Lindor (651)
 Doubles:  José Ramírez (56)
 Extra base hits:  José Ramírez (91)
 Plate appearances:  Francisco Lindor (723)

Fielding
 Ref:
 Assists at first base:  Carlos Santana (95)
 Double plays turned at shortstop:  Francisco Lindor (111)
 Fielding percentage at pitcher: Carlos Carrasco (1.000)
 Games at pitcher:  Bryan Shaw (79)
 Total zone runs at first base:  Carlos Santana (13)
 Range factor per nine innings at catcher:  Roberto Pérez (10.80)

Pitching
 Wins Above Replacement:  Corey Kluber (8.0)

Farm system

See also

 List of Major League Baseball annual doubles leaders
 List of Major League Baseball annual ERA leaders
 List of Major League Baseball annual shutout leaders
 List of Major League Baseball annual wins leaders
 List of Major League Baseball doubles records
 List of Major League Baseball longest winning streaks
 List of Major League Baseball pitchers who have thrown an immaculate inning
 List of Silver Slugger Award winners at shortstop
 List of Silver Slugger Award winners at third base

References

External links
2017 Cleveland Indians season at Baseball Reference''

Cleveland Guardians seasons
American League Central champion seasons
Cleveland
Cleveland Indians